Yury Mikhailovich Gotsanyuk (born 18 July 1966) is the Prime Minister of the self-declared Republic of Crimea since 2019.

References

1966 births
Living people
Prime Ministers of Crimea